Muhammadu Dikko Stadium is an all-seater association football and athletics stadium in Katsina, Katsina State, Nigeria. The stadium is owned and maintained by the Katsina State Government. Construction started in the early 1990s, during the military Governorship of John Madaki, but was later abandoned. The project was resurrected and completed by Governor Ibrahim Shehu Shema, and was opened in 2013 as Karkanda Stadium. In 2016, it was renamed after Katsina's 20th Century Emir Muhammadu Dikko. El-Kanemi Warriors F.C of Maiduguri played their home games at the stadium from 2015 to 2016 while the Boko Haram insurgency raged. It is currently home to the Katsina State-owned Football club Katsina United.
There is also a gymnasium and fitness club located within the stadium.

References

Football venues in Nigeria
Athletics (track and field) venues in Nigeria